Sir Robert Bagod (died 1299) was an Irish judge who was appointed the first Chief Justice of the Irish Common Pleas in 1276. He built Baggotrath Castle, which was the strongest fortress in Dublin: it was located on present-day Baggot Street in central Dublin. He also founded the Carmelite Friary in Dublin.

Early career 

He was born in Dublin, the son of Ralph Bagod; the Bagod family had come to Ireland in the 1170s. Robert spent the earlier part of his career in Limerick, where he served as County Sheriff and Constable of King John's Castle. He was accused of misconduct in respect of his official duties in 1275 but was cleared of all charges. He was held in high regard by the English Crown: he was a friend of Robert Burnell, Bishop of Bath and Wells, the highly influential Lord Chancellor of England, and received a knighthood from King Edward I.

Judge 

In 1276 the Irish Court of Common Pleas (which was often known in its early days as "the Bench") was established. Bagod was chosen to be its Chief Justice (Thomas de Chaddesworth, Dean of St Patrick's Cathedral, acted as Chief Justice for a time in a temporary capacity). He had three associate justices to serve under him; in later centuries the number of junior justices was reduced to two. He was also required to act as a justice in eyre, i.e. itinerant justice, when necessary, although the eyre system was rapidly falling into disuse in Ireland during his term on the Bench, and was rarely used after 1290. In addition to his judicial office, he served as Deputy Treasurer of Ireland. He was regularly called on to sit on special commissions, both in Ireland and England, most notably the commission of inquiry of 1293-4 into alleged misconduct by William de Vesci, the Justiciar of Ireland. With the other members of the Commission, who included Sir  William de Essendon and Sir Walter de la Haye, he was ordered to appear before King Edward and the Parliament in April 1294 to report on their findings.

He was a valued Crown servant: in 1281 he received an unspecified financial reward for his loyalty, and in 1284 in consideration of his long service he was excused from going on assize (always an onerous task, in view of the bad roads and threats of highway robbery). He retired on health grounds in  October 1298, when he was described as being too "old and infirm" to continue in office. He probably died early in the following year.

Family 

His eldest son and heir, Sir Robert Bagod the younger (died  1330), was, like his father, a knight who served as High Sheriff of County Limerick and a justice of the Common Pleas. The younger Robert resigned or was dismissed from the Bench in about 1324. Two of Sir Robert's grandsons, Thomas and Hervey, were also High Court judges.

Landowner 

In 1280 he bought the lands which were then called "the Rath", subsequently called Baggotrath or Baggotstrath, from the Hyntenbergh family. He built Baggotrath Castle, which passed from the Bagods to the Fitzwilliam family. It was severely damaged during the English Civil War, allowed to fall into ruin by its owners, and demolished in the early nineteenth century. The family name is commemorated in Baggot Street and nearby Baggotrath Place. The Hynterberghs also sold him a stone dwelling house near present-day Werburgh  Street. He also acquired lands in Dundrum, Dublin, which his son later sold to the le Poer family.

Possibly his proudest achievement was founding Ireland's only Carmelite Friary in Dublin in about 1274, despite considerable local opposition. It apparently stood on the same site as the present Whitefriar Street Carmelite Church.

He has been described as a man of energy and ability, noted for his loyalty to the Crown and for the confidence the Government placed in him.

Baggot Street in Dublin was named after him.

The Red Book of the Exchequer at Dublin gives his date of death as 6 January 1298, but this is probably a slip for 1299, as the Patent Rolls clearly date his retirement to October 1298.

References

Lawyers from Dublin (city)
13th-century Irish politicians
Chief Justices of the Irish Common Pleas
13th-century Irish judges
High Sheriffs of County Limerick